The artist's mother Ane Hedvig Brøndum in the blue room (Danish: Kunstnerens mor Ane Hedvig Brøndum i den blå stue) is an oil on canvas painting by Danish painter Anna Ancher from 1909. It is held at the National Gallery of Denmark, in Copenhagen.

Description
The painting is oil on canvas, and has dimensions of 38.8 x 56.8 cm.

Analysis
Anna Ancher made several paintings of her mother, Anna Hedvig (Ane) Brøndum (1826-1916), who was married to merchant and innkeeper Erik Andersen Brøndum (1820–90). After her husband's death in 1890 she ran Brøndum's Hotel, with her son Degn Brøndum, until she was 70 years old. The portrait depicts the blue room at the hotel where she lived when at the time, and where she used to read. Several of Anna Ancher's portraits of her mother have the blue room as a setting.

Gallery

References

1909 paintings
Paintings in the collection of the National Gallery of Denmark
Paintings by Anna Ancher
20th-century paintings in Denmark
Books in art
Portraits of women